The Gantocks is a small group of rocks lying off Dunoon in the upper Firth of Clyde, West of Scotland.

A navigation beacon was constructed on the rocks circa 1886.

The MV Akka was lost, after running onto the Gantocks on 9 April 1956.  The PS Waverley ran aground on the rocks on 15 July 1977 with 715 passengers on board.

The Gantocks beacon was repainted and maintenance was carried out during 2018.

Gallery

References

External links

Skerries of Scotland
Firth of Clyde
Cowal
Geography of Dunoon